Nagehan, aka Nagihan, is a Turkish feminine given name. People named "Nagehan" include:

Nagehan
 Nagehan Akşan (born 1988), Turkish women's footballer
 Nagehan Malkoç (born 1985), Turkish female boxer

Nagihan
 Nagihan Avanaş (born 1997), Turkish women's footballer
 Nagihan Karadere (born 1984), Turkish sprint runner

Turkish feminine given names